Archange Nkumu (born 5 November 1993) is an English footballer who plays as a defender or midfielder for 1. deild karla side Þróttur Reykjavík.

Career

Chelsea 
Archange joined the Chelsea Academy at the age of 10 and  has been used in both midfield and defensive positions while progressing through the ranks at the club. He has travelled and been a part of various overseas tournaments with the academy, including the 2010 Dallas Cup.

In the 2010-11 Archange started being picked for reserve team matches, and scored his first goal away at Manchester United in April 2011. Another high point for Nkumu was that he started in the second leg of the 2011-12 FA Youth Cup final, which Chelsea went on and won. He was released by Chelsea in May 2013.

Loan spells
On 23 August 2012, Nkumu joined League One side Yeovil Town on a one-month loan spell.
Nkumu made his professional debut on 18 September 2012 in a 4–1 loss against Leyton Orient as a late substitute.

On 23 October 2012, Nkumu signed on loan for Colchester United until 14 January 2013, but returned a month early, on 1 December 2012.

At the end of April 2019, Nkumu joined Þróttur Reykjavík after a short period at the English club Haringey Borough.

Iceland
In 2015, Nkumu joined 1. deild karla side KA, making 69 league appearances in four seasons with the club, helping them to promotion in his second season. On 19 April 2019, Nkumu left KA to join second-tier side Þróttur Reykjavík.

References

External links

Profile at Hendon F.C.

1993 births
Living people
English footballers
English sportspeople of Democratic Republic of the Congo descent
Association football defenders
Footballers from Tottenham
English Football League players
Chelsea F.C. players
Yeovil Town F.C. players
Knattspyrnufélag Akureyrar players
English expatriate footballers
English expatriate sportspeople in Iceland
1. deild karla players
Úrvalsdeild karla (football) players
Expatriate footballers in Iceland